Sultans of Sentiment is the second album by the indie rock band the Van Pelt, released in 1997. In 2014, the album was remastered and reissued by La Castanya Records.

Critical reception
AllMusic wrote that "their formula works brilliantly on this ten-track CD, with Chris Leo's grueling spoken vocals clearly paving the way for the evocative rock the rest of the band contributes." Vulture.com described "Nanzen Kills a Cat" as "a near-perfect encapsulation" of the emo genre.

Track listing
"Nanzen Kills A Cat" - 4:14
"The Good, The Bad & The Blind" - 4:30
"Yamato (Where People Really Die)" - 2:57
"My Bouts With Pouncing" - 3:00
"Don't Make Me Walk My Own Log" - 3:56
"The Young Alchemists" - 4:04
"We Are The Heathens" - 3:20
"Pockets Of Pricks" - 2:44
"Let's Make A List" - 3:33
"Do The Lovers Still Meet At The Chiang Kai-Shek Memorial?" - 5:06

Personnel
Brian Maryansky
Chris Leo
Neil O'Brien
Sean P. Greene

References

1997 albums
The Van Pelt albums